Rafael Viana de Melo (born August 11, 1988 in Santana do Ipanema), known as Rafinha, is a Brazilian footballer who plays for Bahia de Feira as left back. He already played for national competitions such as Copa do Brasil and Campeonato Brasileiro Série B.

Career statistics

References

External links

1988 births
Living people
Brazilian footballers
Association football fullbacks
Campeonato Brasileiro Série B players
Campeonato Brasileiro Série C players
Campeonato Brasileiro Série D players
Clube de Regatas Brasil players
Votoraty Futebol Clube players
Agremiação Sportiva Arapiraquense players
Ipatinga Futebol Clube players
Associação Atlética Caldense players
Esporte Clube Flamengo players
Associação Atlética Coruripe players
Associação Atlética Anapolina players
Serra Talhada Futebol Clube players
River Atlético Clube players
People from Santana do Ipanema
Sportspeople from Alagoas